Club de Fútbol Inter Playa del Carmen is a Mexican football club that plays in the Liga Premier. The club is based in  Playa del Carmen, Quintana Roo.

History 
Inter Playa del Carmen was founded in 1999 by an agreement between local businessmen and the municipal government. The team participated in the Third Division from 1999 to 2003, when it was champion of the Torneo Clausura, which allowed it to be promoted to the Second Division. Since its promotion in 2003, the team has remained in the same professional category. 

On December 18, 2021, Inter Playa reaches the grand final of the Liga Premier Apertura 2021 tournament for the first time in its history, losing to Alacranes de Durango.

On March 13, 2023, Inter Playa defeated Club Calor to win the Copa Conecta Championship on the road in Monclova. Marea Azul(Blue Tide) took a bus from PDC to Monclova to cheer on their team. The fan club brought their drums and enjoyed a well deserved victory. 

It currently has two professional categories. In the Liga Premier, the coach is Carlos Bracamontes, with whom Inter Playa had 77% effectiveness in the 2021-2022 football year.

In the Third Division the coach is Alejandro Jácome, with whom the team managed to advance from the first round of the final phase since 2003, the year in which the team was promoted.

Inter Playa del Carmen has a rivalry with Pioneros de Cancún due to the geographical proximity and both cities compete in the tourism sector, the game is known as Quintanarroense Classic.

Honors
Tercera División Champions: 1
Clausura 2003
Copa Conecta Champions: 1
2023

Players

Current squad

Reserve teams
Inter Playa del Carmen (Liga TDP)
Reserve team that plays in the Liga TDP, the fourth level of the Mexican league system.

Competitive record

See also
Football in Mexico

Notes

References

External links
Segunda Division

 
Football clubs in Quintana Roo
Solidaridad (municipality)
Liga Premier de México
Association football clubs established in 1999
1999 establishments in Mexico